Conker is a series of platform video games created and produced by Rare. It chronicles the events of Conker the Squirrel, an anthropomorphic red squirrel that made his debut as a playable character in Diddy Kong Racing. 

The Game Boy Color game is targeted at a family audience. Conker's Bad Fur Day was changed during its development to be based on graphic violence, profanity, and other adult material, which earned the game a Mature rating by the ESRB, with an advisory on its box. A graphically improved but censored version of Conker's Bad Fur Day, along with new multiplayer modes, was released as Conker: Live & Reloaded on June 21, 2005 in North America for the original Xbox. The uncensored Conker's Bad Fur Day was released on Rare Replay and Live & Reloaded has been made backward compatible with the Xbox One.

Games

Conker's Pocket Tales (1999) - Game Boy Color 
Conker's Bad Fur Day (2001) - Nintendo 64
Conker: Live & Reloaded (2005) - Xbox
Young Conker (2016) - Microsoft HoloLens

Related games
Diddy Kong Racing (1997) - Nintendo 64
Project Spark (Conker's Big Reunion) (2014) - Xbox One
Rare Replay (2015) - Xbox One

Development
Conker was introduced at the Electronic Entertainment Expo in 1997. The game Conker's Quest was presented by Rare as a 3D platformer aimed at a young audience for the Nintendo 64. Later the same year, Conker's inclusion in Diddy Kong Racing for the Nintendo 64 was confirmed. In early 1998, Conker's Quest was renamed Twelve Tales: Conker 64. In 1999, Conker made his first solo debut in Conker's Pocket Tales for the Game Boy Color. 

During development, the Conker team looked around E3 of 1998 where there were many games that were quite similar or were the same. They realized that there was nothing special or unique about Conker other than it was just another cute platformer. After E3, Chris Seavor came on board as designer. The first level, the beehive, added machine guns shooting wasps which Rare found funny and kept going with this idea to be raunchy and different. After two more years of development, the game emerged as Conker's Bad Fur Day, which targets adults rather than children with its mature content. According to Rare co-founder Chris Stamper: "When people grow up on games, they don't stop playing. There aren't games for people who grew up on the early systems". The game suffered from relatively poor sales, but received a cult following.

After the release of Conker's Bad Fur Day, Rare began development of a new Conker game referred to as Conker's Other Bad Day. Designer Chris Seavor said that it was to be a direct sequel dealing with "Conker's somewhat unsuccessful tenure as King. He spends all the treasury money on beer, parties and hookers. Thrown into prison, Conker is faced with the prospect of execution and the game starts with his escape, ball and chain attached, from the Castle's highest tower". It was never confirmed which console Conker's Other Bad Day was for, but it was likely the Nintendo GameCube as with Donkey Kong Racing. In 2002, Microsoft purchased Rare from Nintendo, so instead of finishing and releasing the game, Rare remade Conker's Bad Fur Day for the Xbox in 2005, renaming it Conker: Live & Reloaded. It features improved graphics and minor alterations to gameplay, and was also censored. It has a new multiplayer adaptation for Xbox Live. After Live & Reloaded, Rare started development on Conker: Gettin' Medieval, an online multiplayer third-person shooter game, but it was ultimately cancelled.

At E3 2014, Conker was announced as a character in Project Spark. In 2015, Conker returned in a new episodic campaign for Project Spark. The campaign, titled Conker's Big Reunion, is set ten years after the events of Bad Fur Day and Seavor reprised his voice role. The first episode was released on 23 April the same year for Project Spark; however, before any more additional episodes could be made, Project Sparks online services were shut down and the game was abandoned. In 2015, Conker's Bad Fur Day was included in the Rare Replay video game compilation for Xbox One.

In 2016, Microsoft announced Young Conker as the next installment into the series, released for the Microsoft HoloLens. The trailer was released in February and was almost universally panned by the public, with many complaining that it lacked the humour and overall style of its predecessors. The trailer received more than 30,000 dislikes against just over 1,000 likes. A petition was created to cancel the game's release but failed. Some video game critics and general YouTube commentators have boycotted the game.

References

 
Rare (company)
Microsoft franchises
Video game franchises
Video game franchises introduced in 1999